Irreverent is an Australian drama television miniseries which was released on 30 November 2022 on Peacock in the United States and on 4 December 2022 on Netflix in Australia and New Zealand. Irreverent follows the story of an American criminal who bungles a heist and is forced to hide out in a small Australian reef town in Far North Queensland posing as the new church minister.

Production
Irreverent was created by Paddy Macrae and written by Paddy Macrae, Andrew Knight, Andrew Anastasios, Angela McDonald, Dan Knight and Darlene Johnson. It was directed by Jonathan Teplitzky and Lucy Gaffy, executive produced by Debbie Lee, Paddy Macrae, Alastair Mackinnon and Andrew Knight, and produced by Tom Hoffie. The series was filmed in Mission Beach, Queensland.

Cast
 Colin Donnell as Paulo, a Chicago gangster forced to take refuge in the remote town of Clump, posing as the Reverend Mackenzie Boyd
 P. J. Byrne as Mackenzie, the reverend who was originally posted to Clump.
  Kylie Bracknell as Piper, the police officer in charge of lawkeeping in Clump
 Tegan Stimson as Daisy, a troubled teenager who befriends Paulo
 Ed Oxenbould as Cameron, Daisy's best friend
 Wayne Blair as Peter, a Deacon of the church in Clump
 Jason Wilder as Aidan, Piper's fiance
 Robert Rabiah as Farah, a hitman sent to find Paulo and kill him
 Briallen Clarke as Amy, resident of Clump
 Calen Tassone as Harry
 Russell Dykstra as Lester
 Andrea Szabo as Bev
 Felix Hooper as Young Mack
 Francis Greenslade as Ron

Episodes

References

2022 Australian television series debuts
2020s Australian television miniseries
2020s Australian drama television series
Peacock (streaming service) original programming
English-language Netflix original programming
Television series by Matchbox Pictures